The Băița is a right tributary of the river Fleț in Romania. It discharges into the Fleț near Sântu.

References

Rivers of Romania
Rivers of Mureș County